Umor was the ruler of Bulgaria in 766.

According to the Namelist of Bulgarian Rulers, Umor reigned for only 40 days in 766 and belonged to the Ukil clan, which makes him a relative of the former rulers Vinekh and possibly Kormisosh.  The Byzantine sources indicate that his predecessor Sabin entrusted Bulgaria to Umor, but give no details of his short reign or fate.  Some scholars speculate that he was a champion of the peace party like his discredited predecessor, and that he may have likewise fled to the Byzantine Empire.

The 17th century Volga Bulgar compilation Ja'far Tarikh (a work of disputed authenticity) represents Yumart (i.e., Umor) as the elderly father-in-law of the former ruler Teles (i.e., Telets).  According to this source Yumart deposed Sain (i.e., Sabin) and died shortly afterwards.

References
 Mosko Moskov, Imennik na bălgarskite vladeteli (novo tălkuvane), Sofia 1988.
 Jordan Andreev, Ivan Lazarov, Plamen Pavlov, Koj koj e v srednovekovna Bălgarija, Sofia 1999.
 (primary source), Bahši Iman, Džagfar Tarihy, vol. III, Orenburg 1997.

8th-century births
8th-century deaths
8th-century Bulgarian monarchs